Prince George—Peace River—Northern Rockies (previously Prince George—Peace River) is a federal electoral district in northern British Columbia, Canada. It has been represented in the House of Commons of Canada since 1968.

Geography
It consists of all of the province of British Columbia east of the Great Divide and some communities west of the divide.  It contains large areas of uninhabited wilderness.

Communities include the oil-and-gas exploration centre of Fort St. John; Fort Nelson, with the province's biggest wood products plant; Dawson Creek; Large Coal Mining operations in Tumbler Ridge and the part of Prince George north of the Nechako River and east of the Fraser River.

History
This electoral district was originally created in 1966 from parts of Cariboo and Kamloops ridings.

It was abolished in 1976 when it was redistributed into Fort Nelson—Peace River riding and a part of Prince George—Bulkley Valley ridings. In 1978, Fort Nelson—Peace River was renamed "Prince George—Peace River". There were no elections during the period it was called "Fort Nelson—Peace River".

This riding has elected conservative candidates consistently since 1972: Progressive Conservative Frank Oberle from 1972 to 1993, and Reform Party of Canada/Canadian Alliance/Conservative Jay Hill from 1993 until 2010.  The district is currently represented by Bob Zimmer of the Conservatives.

The 2012 federal electoral boundaries redistribution concluded that the electoral boundaries of Prince George—Peace River should be adjusted, and a modified electoral district will be contested in future elections. The redefined riding regains the community of Valemount and area that had been transferred to Kamloops—Thompson—Cariboo in the previous redistribution. Although not directly related to this boundary adjustment, the riding was renamed as Prince George—Peace River—Northern Rockies to acknowledge the Northern Rockies Regional District, whose status in the riding is unchanged. These new boundaries and the new name were legally defined in the 2013 representation order, which came into effect upon the call of the 42nd Canadian federal election.

Demographics

Members of Parliament

This riding has elected the following Members of Parliament:

Current Member of Parliament
Its current Member of Parliament is Bob Zimmer. He was first elected in 2011. He represents the Conservative Party of Canada.

Election results

Prince George—Peace River—Northern Rockies, 2015–present

Prince George—Peace River, 1968–2015

See also
 List of Canadian federal electoral districts
 Past Canadian electoral districts

References

 Library of Parliament Riding Profile 1966–1976
 Library of Parliament Riding Profile 1978–2005
 Expenditures – 2004
 Expenditures – 2000
 Expenditures – 1997

Notes

External links
 Website of the Parliament of Canada

British Columbia federal electoral districts
Dawson Creek
Fort St. John, British Columbia
Peace River Country
Politics of Prince George, British Columbia